Penmani Aval Kanmani is a 1988 Indian Tamil-language film, directed by Visu and produced by Rajam Balachander and Pushpa Kandaswamy. The film stars Pratap Pothen, Seetha, Visu and Kishmu. It was released on 11 March 1988. The film was remade in Telugu as Aadade Adharam.

Plot 
The movie deals with how Radio Mama (Visu) solves the family related problems in the other neighbouring households. Four families are principally involved in this movie. Visu's family consists of his son Prathap Pothen, daughter-in-law Kutti Padmini and their two kids. Visu always causes trouble at home by ignoring household chores and instead focussing on neighbouring household's problems. Ilavarasan's family consists of his wife Aruna and parents Delhi Ganesh and Kamala Kamesh. Aruna ill-treats her in-laws. Dilip's family consists of his wife Seetha and mother M.N.Rajam. Seetha is tortured by her mother-in-law. Kishmu's family consists of his wife Vadivukkarasi, son Ramesh Arvind and daughter-in-law Madhuri. Kishmu and his son are drunkards and do not earn anything for their family.

How Radio Mama solves the different problems of Dowry, Ill treatment of mother and father-in-laws by daughter-in-law, Ill treatment of daughter-in-laws by mother-in-law, Alcoholism in slums, etc with his wit, courage and humour forms the story of the movie.

Cast 

Radio Mama's family
Prathap Pothen as Parandhaman
Kutty Padmini as Kalpana
Visu as Radio Mama
Kamala's family
Delhi Ganesh as Kamala's husband
Kamala Kamesh as Kamala
Ilavarasan as Sudha's husband
Aruna as Sudha
Uma's family
Dilip as Dilip
Seetha as Uma
M. N. Rajam as Dilip's mother
G. Srinivasan as Uma's father
Vadivu's family
Vadivukkarasi as Vadivu
Kishmu as Vadivu's husband
Madhuri as Meenakshi
Ramesh Aravind as Meenakshi's husband
Penmani magazine
Manorama as Ambujam Viswanath, Editor-in-Chief of Penmani magazine
Old age home scene (Cameo appearance)
Kula Deivam V. R. Rajagopal
Typist Gopu
Omakuchi Narasimhan
Sethu Vinayagam

Soundtrack 
Soundtrack was composed by Shankar–Ganesh. The lyrics were penned by Vaali.

References

External links 
 

1980s Tamil-language films
1988 comedy-drama films
1988 films
Films directed by Visu
Films scored by Shankar–Ganesh
Films with screenplays by Visu
Indian comedy-drama films
Tamil films remade in other languages